In God We Trust is the fourth studio album by Christian metal band Stryper, released in 1988. The album achieved Gold record status, selling over half a million copies. Three singles were released including "Always There For You" and "I Believe in You" which both hit the Billboard Hot 100 chart peaking at No. 71 and No. 88 respectively - the second song, however, became a hit in Brazil, as part of soundtrack of the novela O Salvador da Pátria. The third single "Keep The Fire Burning" did not chart. The album received two GMA Dove Awards for "Hard Music Album" and "Hard Rock Song" for the title track.

Track listing
All songs written by Michael Sweet except where noted
 "In God We Trust" (M. Sweet, Robert Sweet) – 3:56
 "Always There for You" – 4:09
 "Keep the Fire Burning" – 3:35
 "I Believe in You" – 3:17
 "The Writings on the Wall" – 4:19
 "It's Up 2 U" – 3:51
 "The World of You and I" – 3:45
 "Come to the Everlife" (Oz Fox) – 4:09
 "Lonely" – 4:09
 "The Reign" (Fox) – 2:50

Personnel 
Stryper
 Michael Sweet – lead vocals, backing vocals, guitars
 Oz Fox – lead guitars, backing vocals
 Robert Sweet – drums

Additional musicians
 Billy Meyers – keyboards
 John Van Tongeren – keyboards
 Stephen Croes – Synclavier programming
 Brad Cobb – session bassist

Production 
 Michael Lloyd – producer, mixing 
 Stryper – producers, mixing, album design concept
 Dan Nebanzal – engineer, mixing 
 Carmine Rubino – engineer, mixing
 Tom Bosley – assistant engineer
 Charlie Brocco – assistant engineer
 Dave Deavalon – assistant engineer
 Jeff DeMorris – assistant engineer, mix assistant 
 Scott Gordon – assistant engineer
 Robert Hart – assistant engineer, mix assistant 
 Mark McKenna – assistant engineer
 Gary Myerberg – assistant engineer
 Brian Scheuble – assistant engineer 
 Bob Vogt – assistant engineer 
 Bernie Grundman – mastering at Bernie Grundman Mastering (Hollywood, California)
 Patrick Pending – art direction 
 Neil Zlozower – photography 
 Anne Revenge – additional photography 
 Kyle Rae Sweet – make-up
 Ray Brown – wardrobe stylist

References

External links 
CCM Magazine Review
Cornerstone Review

1988 albums
Stryper albums
Enigma Records albums